Al Hashimiyah is a town in Babil Governorate, Iraq.

Background
Al Hashimiyah is named after Hashemites who inhabited the region.

Climate
Al Hashimiyah has a hot desert climate (Köppen climate classification BWh). Most rain falls in the winter. About  of precipitation falls annually.

References

Hashimiyah
Hashimiyah
Hashimiyah